Britt Bohlin Olsson (born 1956) is a Swedish social democratic politician, who has served as Secretary-General of the Nordic Council since 2014 until 2021. She was a member of the Riksdag from 1988 to 2008. She served as County Governor of Jämtland County from 2008 to 2014, and was replaced in the Riksdag by Renée Jeryd.

External links

 Britt Bohlin Olsson at the Riksdag website
  Jämtland County 

Members of the Riksdag from the Social Democrats
Living people
1956 births
Women members of the Riksdag
Members of the Riksdag 2002–2006
21st-century Swedish women politicians
Women county governors of Sweden